= Alexandra Panafidina =

Russian book publisher

Alexandra Samuilovna Panafidina (1873–1919), was a book publisher from the Russian Empire. She was married to Andrei Yakovlevich Panafidin (1857–1902). She took over the book publication firm of her spouse in 1902, "Book Publication Firm and Book Company AS Panafidina." She and her husband played an important part among contemporary Russian book firms.
